Trachyphloeosoma is a genus of broad-nosed weevils in the beetle family Curculionidae. There are about five described species in Trachyphloeosoma.

Species
These five species belong to the genus Trachyphloeosoma:
 Trachyphloeosoma advena Zimmermann, 1956 i c g b
 Trachyphloeosoma brevicolle Voss, 1974 c g
 Trachyphloeosoma buruana (Heller, 1929) c g
 Trachyphloeosoma nudum Borovec, 2014 c g
 Trachyphloeosoma setosum Wollaston, 1869 c g
Data sources: i = ITIS, c = Catalogue of Life, g = GBIF, b = Bugguide.net

References

Further reading

 
 
 
 

Entiminae
Articles created by Qbugbot